František "Frank" Kaberle (born November 8, 1973) is a Czech former  professional ice hockey defenceman. His playing career extended over 20 seasons, most notably in the National Hockey League with the Los Angeles Kings, Atlanta Thrashers, and the Carolina Hurricanes.

Playing career
Kaberle was drafted 76th overall in the 1999 NHL Entry Draft by the Kings. During the 1999-2000 season, he was traded to the Atlanta Thrashers for whom he would score his first career NHL goal on April 8, 2000 against Artūrs Irbe and the Carolina Hurricanes in a 4-3 Thrashers loss.  Coincidentally, after the 2004-05 lockout, Kaberle would sign with Carolina.

In the 2006 Stanley Cup Finals, Kaberle scored a power play goal in the second period of Game 7 against the Edmonton Oilers, which would turn out to be the game and Stanley Cup winning goal. It would mark Kaberle's only Stanley Cup championship.

During the off-season before the 2006–07 season, Kaberle suffered a shoulder injury, and was placed on the injured reserve on September 13, 2006. He was removed from the injured reserve on February 6, 2007, and scored the game winner that same night.

After four seasons with the Hurricanes, Kaberle was declared a free agent after he was bought out his final year of his contract on July 28, 2009. With his North American career at a close, he returned to his native Czech Republic and re-joined his original club, HC Kladno, for the 2009–10 season.

Kaberle played two more seasons in the Czech Extraliga with HC Pardubice and HC Plzeň before concluding his professional career after the 2011–12 season.

International play

František Kaberle won the Ice Hockey World Championships five times: in 1996, 1999, 2000, 2001 and 2005. In 2006, he won the bronze medal at the Olympic Games in Turin. That same year, he would become the third player (first and second were Igor Larionov and Pavel Datsyuk in 2002) to win both bronze medal and Stanley Cup.

Personal life
František Kaberle married his wife Kateřina on May 30, 1998. They have two daughters named Francesca and Vanessa.

His brother Tomáš Kaberle is a former NHL and Czech Extraliga player and is also a fellow Stanley Cup champion with the Boston Bruins in 2011. Both of the Kaberle brothers were named to the Czech national ice hockey team for the 2006 Winter Olympics, winning bronze.

His father František Kaberle, Sr. used to play for the Czechoslovak national ice hockey team as well.

Career statistics

Regular season and playoffs

International

See also
Notable families in the NHL
List of Olympic medalist families

References

External links

1973 births
Atlanta Thrashers players
Carolina Hurricanes players
Czech ice hockey defencemen
Ice hockey players at the 2006 Winter Olympics
Rytíři Kladno players
Living people
Long Beach Ice Dogs (IHL) players
Los Angeles Kings draft picks
Los Angeles Kings players
Lowell Lock Monsters players
Modo Hockey players
Olympic bronze medalists for the Czech Republic
Olympic ice hockey players of the Czech Republic
Sportspeople from Kladno
Stanley Cup champions
Olympic medalists in ice hockey
HC Dynamo Pardubice players
HC Plzeň players
Medalists at the 2006 Winter Olympics
Czech expatriate ice hockey players in Sweden
Czechoslovak ice hockey defencemen
Czech expatriate ice hockey players in the United States